Hell Energy Drink (stylized as HELL) is a popular energy drink brand distributed primarily in Europe and Asia. The brand was initiated in 2006 by a privately owned company, founded in Hungary, 2004, which took the name "Hell Energy Magyarország Kft." in 2009.
Within three years it became the market leader in Hungary. A major milestone for the brand's popularity was a two-year sponsorship deal with the AT&T Williams Formula 1 Team, where Hell Energy became second in the energy drink sector to enter the world of Formula 1 Racing. Hell Energy is now also a market leader in Bulgaria, Romania, Slovakia, Cyprus, Azerbaijan, North Macedonia, Greece, Croatia and Serbia and is available in more than 50 countries worldwide. Hell produces the energy drink Speedstar for NORMA supermarkets. Hell Energy has headquarters in Hungary, Romania, the United Kingdom, Russia and also in Cyprus.

Hell Energy is the builder and owner of Avalon Park, a resort, spa and event center complex in Miskolctapolca, a resort belonging to Miskolc. Avalon won several awards including gold medals in three categories at the World Luxury Hotel Awards. It received the internationally recognized 5-star classification at the International Hotel Awards.

Factory
The Hell Energy factory was built in 2011 in Szikszó, Hungary. It has two can filling lines with production capacity of 2 million cans per day. There is a laboratory for the constant monitoring of the drinks' parameters. The factory has the highest food safety certificate - FSSC22000 -  available in Europe. In 2012 the factory was officially voted as one of the best three factories in Europe in the 'Global and World Class Manufacturing' category at the Strategic Manufacturing Award in Düsseldorf, Germany. The plant is accompanied with a fully automatized logistic center with an area of 6000 square meters.
The Hell Energy filling factory is able to manufacture 250, 330, 475, and 500 ml cans. Hell Energy has been producing for the domestic and export market since 2011 in the Szikszó bottling factory. The can filling line has an annual capacity of 600 million cans, thus it can accept assignments and outsource requests from other brands.

Ingredients

The caffeine content of a single can of Hell Energy is 80 mg/250 mL (32 mg/100 mL). This is about the same as one cup of espresso coffee.

Marketing
In 2018, Hell Energy signed Bruce Willis as their brand ambassador.

Footnotes

External links

Soft drinks
Energy drinks
Hungarian brands
Food and drink companies of Hungary